The Irish Fusiliers of Canada was an infantry regiment of the Non-Permanent Active Militia of the Canadian Militia (now the Canadian Army). In 1936, the regiment was amalgamated with The Vancouver Regiment to form The Irish Fusiliers of Canada (The Vancouver Regiment), which today forms part of The British Columbia Regiment (Duke of Connaught's Own).

Lineage

The Irish Fusiliers of Canada 

 Originated on 15 August 1913, in Vancouver, British Columbia, as the 11th Regiment Irish Fusiliers of Canada.
 Redesignated on 12 March 1920, as The Irish Fusiliers of Canada.
 Amalgamated on 1 June 1936, with The Vancouver Regiment and redesignated as the Irish Fusiliers (Vancouver Regiment).

Perpetuations 

 121st Battalion (Western Irish), CEF

History

Early history 
On 15 August 1913, the 11th Regiment Irish Fusiliers of Canada was authorized for service. The regiment had its headquarters and companies in Vancouver.

Great War 
On 6 August 1914, the 11th Regiment Irish Fusiliers of Canada was placed on active service for local protection duties.

On 22 December 1915, the 121st Battalion (Western Irish), CEF, was authorized for service, and on 14 November 1916 the battalion embarked for Great Britain. After its arrival in the UK, the battalion provided reinforcements for the Canadian Corps in the field. On 10 January 1917, the battalion’s personnel were absorbed by the 16th Reserve Battalion, CEF. Finally on 17 July 1917, the 121st Battalion, CEF, was disbanded.

1920s–1930s 
On 15 March 1920, as a result of the Otter Commission and the following post-war reorganization of the Canadian Militia, the 11th Regiment Irish Fusiliers of Canada was redesignated as The Irish Fusiliers of Canada and was reorganized with 2 battalions (1 of them a paper-only reserve battalion) to perpetuate the assigned war-raised battalions of the Canadian Expeditionary Force.

As a result of the 1936 Canadian Militia reorganization, on 1 June 1936, The Irish Fusiliers of Canada were amalgamated with The Vancouver Regiment to form the Irish Fusiliers (Vancouver Regiment) later redesignated as The Irish Fusiliers of Canada (The Vancouver Regiment).

Organization

11th Regiment, Irish Fusiliers of Canada (15 August 1913) 

 Regimental Headquarters (Vancouver, British Columbia)
 No. 1 Company
 No. 2 Company
 No. 3 Company
 No. 4 Company
 No. 5 Company
 No. 6 Company
 No. 7 Company
 No. 8 Company

The Irish Fusiliers of Canada (02 July, 1920) 

 1st Battalion (perpetuating the 121st Battalion, CEF)
 2nd (Reserve) Battalion

Battle Honours 

 Ypres, 1915, '17
 Festubert, 1915
 Somme, 1916
 Arras, 1917, '18
 Hill 70
 Amiens
 Hindenburg Line
 Valenciennes

Notable members 

 Sherwood Lett

References 

Irish regiments in Canada
Fusilier regiments of Canada
Irish Fusiliers of Canada (The Vancouver Regiment)
Military units and formations of British Columbia
Military units and formations established in 1913
Military units and formations disestablished in 1936